The KIA Football Club is an Iranian youth football academy that was established by Mehdi Mahdavikia in 2015 in southeastern Tehran.

German magazine 11 Freunde has described it as "the best football academy" in Iran, and unique in terms of being dedicated to "sustainable, conceptual youth work". The club follows the TSG 1899 Hoffenheim-model, i.e. starting at grassroots-level before developing into a team that can enter the professional leagues. Each year, the club scouts more than a thousand players from all across the country and after trials, only retains top 25 talents.

KIA has shown remarkable results since its foundation and frequently travels to Europe in order to play against renowned opponents.

Current squads

U17

U16 
These players can also play with the U17 squad.

Current staff

Honours

Domestic league competitions

International

References

External links 
 Official website
 KIA Football Academy – Tehran Football Committee

Football academies in Iran
Football clubs in Iran
2015 establishments in Iran
Association football clubs established in 2015